
Janów Lubelski County is a unit of territorial administration and local government (powiat) in Lublin Voivodeship, eastern Poland. It was established on January 1, 1999, as a result of the Polish local government reforms passed in 1998.

As of 2019, its total population is 44,383, out of which the population of Janów Lubelski is 11,901 and the rural population is 32,482.

Neighbouring counties
Janów Lubelski County is bordered by Kraśnik County and Lublin County to the north, Biłgoraj County to the south-east, Nisko County to the south-west, and Stalowa Wola County to the west.

Administrative division
The county is subdivided into seven gminas (one urban-rural and six rural). These are listed in the following table, in descending order of population.

References

 
Land counties of Lublin Voivodeship